Novy is a rural locality (a village) in Nadezhdinsky Selsoviet, Iglinsky District, Bashkortostan, Russia. The population was 31 as of 2010. There is 1 street.

Geography 
Novy is located 43 km east of Iglino (the district's administrative centre) by road. Urman is the nearest rural locality.

References 

Rural localities in Iglinsky District